The 2014 FIM Motocross World Championship was the 58th F.I.M. Motocross World Championship season. It included 17 events including Qatar, Thailand, Brazil, Italy, The Netherlands, Great Britain, France, Germany, Sweden, Finland, Czech Republic, Belgium and Mexico.

In the premier MXGP class, Tony Cairoli won his sixth consecutive championship title, matching the previous record set by Stefan Everts between 2001 and 2006. Cairoli, riding a KTM, won a total of 9 rounds and 15 races en route to the title, finishing 119 points clear of his nearest rival, Jeremy Van Horebeek, riding a Yamaha. In his second season at MXGP level, Van Horebeek achieved his maiden race victory at Loket in the Czech Republic, and also took his first round win in the process. Third place in the final championship standings went to Suzuki's Kevin Strijbos, who won the other race at Loket. Fourth place went to another Suzuki rider, Clément Desalle, who won four rounds and seven races, but due to an injury suffered at Uddevalla, he missed four of the last five rounds. Other riders to take round victories were Gautier Paulin – book-ending the season with victories in the season-opening and season-closing rounds – and Maximilian Nagl, while both riders each won five races.

In MX2, the season was dominated by the Red Bull KTM Factory Racing team, and in particular, two-time defending champion Jeffrey Herlings. Herlings won 12 of the first 13 rounds to be held during the season, and 22 of the 26 races including a streak of 18 consecutive victories; after Hyvinkää, Herlings was 145 points clear of team-mate Jordi Tixier, with only 200 points available at the final 4 rounds. However, while competing in a charity event between events, Herlings crashed and suffered a broken femur. He was unable to compete in the next three rounds, where Tixier took a round win and two victories; he never finished lower than fourth in the six-race run. Herlings' advantage was reduced to 23 points, but he elected to compete in the final round in Mexico. However, he could do no better than tenth in either race, with Tixier taking a win and a third place – winning the round in the process – to take his first world title, by just four points. The top three placings were completed by Romain Febvre, who achieved a race and round win in Goiânia. Max Anstie and Arnaud Tonus were the only other riders to take round wins – each winning one race – while race victories were also taken by Glenn Coldenhoff (two wins), Tim Gajser (two wins), Dylan Ferrandis and Christophe Charlier.

Race calendar and results 
Originally scheduled for 17 August as the sixteenth round of the championship, the Ukrainian GP was postponed in April due to pro-Russian unrest in the country.

Source

Participants

MXGP 

Source

MX2 

Source

Championship standings

MXGP

MX2

References

External links 
 

Motocross
Motocross World Championship seasons